Striatolamia is an extinct genus of sharks belonging to the family Odontaspididae. These extinct sharks lived from the Early Paleocene to Late Miocene (61.7 to 10.3 Ma).

Etymology 
The Latin genus name Striatolamia refers to the striations on the surface of the teeth.

Taxonomy 
This genus had been assigned to families Mitsukurinidae and Striatolamiidae by other authors.

Similar and related genera include Carcharoides, Parodontaspis, Priodontaspis, Pseudoisurus and Synodontaspis.

Species 
Species within this genus include:
 Striatolamia macrota  Agassiz 1843
 Striatolamia striata (Winkler 1874)
 Striatolamia whitei (Arambourg, 1952)

Description 
Its teeth are notably big and rather common in sediments. The anterior teeth have elongated crowns, with striations on the lingual face and small lateral cusplets. The lateral teeth are smaller and broader, with weaker striations.

S. macrota anterior teeth have smaller roots than S. striata, and they are often recurved. Another difference between these two species is the length of their teeth. Teeth of striata are generally smaller than macrota.

Distribution and habitat 
Most widespread species of Striatolamia are S. striata and S. macrota. Fossil teeth and calcified vertebrae of Striatolamia species have been found all over the world. These sharks lived in waters with low salinity.

See also 

 Isurolamna
Serratolamna
Otodus
Jackelotodus

References

Further reading 
 Fossils (Smithsonian Handbooks) by David Ward (Page 202)
 Joe Cocke "Fossil shark teeth of the world"
 Cyril Walker & David Ward (1993) - Fossielen: Sesam Natuur Handboeken, Bosch & Keuning, Baarn.

External links 
 Striatolamia macrota

Odontaspididae
Prehistoric shark genera
Paleocene fish
Eocene fish
Oligocene fish
Miocene fish
Prehistoric fish of Australia
Prehistoric fish of Africa
Prehistoric fish of Asia
Prehistoric fish of Europe
Prehistoric fish of North America
Prehistoric fish of South America
Eocene animals of South America
Paleogene Chile
Fossils of Chile
Fossils of Great Britain
Fossils of England
Prehistoric fish of Antarctica
Fossil taxa described in 1964